Mandurah Road is the name given to two roads in the cities of Perth and Mandurah, Western Australia, which link together at Stakehill Road, Karnup.

Route description
The northern part starts in the Kwinana Beach industrial area. After 2 km and reaching the City of Rockingham boundary, it becomes a semi-rural single carriageway road which runs past wetlands east of Rockingham such as Lake Cooloongup and Lake Walyungup. It also provides access to the residential and rural-residential sections of the suburb of Baldivis.

The southern part starts at Stakehill Road and is a dual carriageway and part of National Highway 1. It is actually a continuation of Ennis Avenue coming from Rockingham. It continues to Mandurah, where it intersects with Mandjoogoordap Drive at a roundabout before crossing Pinjarra Road and heading west to meet Old Coast Road which was traditionally the main road to Bunbury and South West of Western Australia, until the opening of Forrest Highway superseded it. However Old Coast Road still serves as an alternative route there.

History

Until 2005, the road changed name at the City of Mandurah boundary line (between Singleton and Madora Bay) to "Fremantle Road", but this was changed by a decision of the City of Mandurah in September 2005. This change has been recognised by the Government in the 2007 Streetsmart street directory.

Major intersections

All intersections below are controlled by traffic signals unless otherwise indicated.

See also

References

Roads in Perth, Western Australia
City of Rockingham
Mandurah
Highway 1 (Australia)